Eucithara novaehollandiae, common name the thick-lipped mangelia, is a small sea snail, a marine gastropod mollusk in the family Mangeliidae.

Description
The length of the shell varies between 5 mm and 11 mm.

The shell is longitudinally plicately ribbed. The ribs cross the shoulder to the suture. The color of the shell is yellowish white or light brown, banded with pale chocolate, crossed with numerous obscure fine white lines.

The oblong shell has a short spire and is a little turreted. The whorls are rounded at the upper part and longitudinally closely ribbed. The outer lip is more than usually thickened. The shell has a lead color or is banded with lead color, crossed with numerous obscure fine white lines.

Distribution
This marine species occurs off the Philippines, Polynesia, New Caledonia, Western Australia and Mozambique.

References

 Souverbie, S.M. & Montrouzier, R.P. 1872. Diagnoses de Mollusques inedits provenant de la Nouvelle-Caledonie. Journal de Conchyliologie 20: 361-365
 Jousseaume, F.P. 1883. Descriptions de coquilles nouvelles. Le Naturaliste 2: 324-325
 Boettger, O. 1895. Die marinen Mollusken der Philippinen. IV. Die Pleurotomiden. Nachrichtsblatt der Deutschen Malakozooligischen Gesellschaft 27(1-2, 3-4): 1-20, 41-63
 Bouge, L.J. & Dautzenberg, P.L. 1914. Les Pleurotomides de la Nouvelle-Caledonie et de ses dependances. Journal de Conchyliologie 61: 123-214
 Cernohorsky, W.O. 1978. Tropical Pacific Marine Shells. Sydney : Pacific Publications 352 pp., 68 pls.
 Springsteen, F.J. & Leobrera, F.M. 1986. Shells of the Philippines. Manila : Carfel Seashell Museum 377 pp., 100 pls.
 Trew, A. 1991. The Melvill-Tomlin Collection. Handlists of the Molluscan Collection in the Department of Zoology, National Museum of Wales. Part 59. Conacea (Turridae).

External links
  Tucker, J.K. 2004 Catalog of recent and fossil turrids (Mollusca: Gastropoda). Zootaxa 682:1-1295
 Kilburn R.N. 1992. Turridae (Mollusca: Gastropoda) of southern Africa and Mozambique. Part 6. Subfamily Mangeliinae, section 1. Annals of the Natal Museum, 33: 461–575
 
 MNHN, Paris: Mangelia anna (lectotype)

novaehollandiae
Gastropods described in 1846